Kiwanis Park is a 3,500 seat (expandable to 7,500) baseball field located in Moncton, New Brunswick. The field was donated to the City of Moncton in 1953 by the local Kiwanis Club. It is the largest baseball field in Canada east of Quebec City. The field is the current home of the Moncton Fisher Cats (formerly the Moncton Mets) and also, the Junior and Minor league Metro Mudcats. It has played host to many baseball tournaments including the 1975 Intercontinental Cup, the 1997 World Junior Baseball Championship, and the 2004 Baseball Canada Senior Championships.

In June 2010, the a $2 million upgrade was completed which included artificial turf, batting cages, bleachers, bullpens, new dugouts, new sod, outfield fence, a modern drainage system, and a new lighting system.

See also 
 Moncton Sport Facilities

References

Further reading 
 

Baseball in New Brunswick
Baseball venues in Canada
Kiwanis
Sports venues in Moncton